Dr. Carol Colatrella is a two-time Fulbright scholar and an award-winning teacher who is active in programmatic and administrative roles both on the Georgia Tech campus and externally. She is a Professor in the School of Literature, Media, and Communication and Associate Dean in the Ivan Allen College of Liberal Arts.

Appointed in 2012 as Ivan Allen College of Liberal Arts Associate Dean for Graduate Studies, she is a long-time co-director of the Georgia Tech Center for the Study of Women, Science, and Technology (WST), which is part of the Office of the Vice President for Institute Diversity. WST sponsors technical and scholarly presentations, career development workshops, and focused research programs, and coordinates mentoring networks for faculty and students, including the WST Learning Community.  From 2005 to 2007, she served as program director of the Georgia Tech-National Science Foundation ADVANCE Institutional Transformation program.

A student of John O. McCormick, Colatrella received her Ph.D. in Comparative Literature from Rutgers University, New Brunswick. Her research ranges across nineteenth- and twentieth-century American and European literary, historical, and scientific narratives, particularly those emphasizing moral transgression and social marginality.  Her scholarly work is strongly interdisciplinary and has been funded by national and international foundations. She held Fulbright fellowships based in Denmark in 2000 and in 2005-06, during the latter working with an international group of scholars. Other fellowships include a Nunn School European Union Center Grant for 2010-11 and a residency at Zentrum für Literatur- und Kulturforschung, Berlin in June 2008. Colatrella has co-edited two books and authored and/or co-authored 37 book chapters and articles and three books, most recently Toys and Tools in Pink: Cultural Narratives of Gender, Science, and Technology (The Ohio State University Press, 2011).

Since 1993, she has served as executive director of the Society for Literature, Science, and the Arts. More recently she began serving as a member of the board of advisors for the society's journal, Configurations. She also serves on the advisory board for Anthroposcene, a book series sponsored by the society and Pennsylvania State University Press.

Colatrella was recognized in 2007 with Georgia Tech's Geoffrey G. Eicholz Faculty Teaching Award and in 2005 with Georgia Tech's Outstanding Service Award. As a professor of literature and cultural studies, she teaches courses in literature and gender studies.

In 2013 Colatrella, WST co-director Mary Lynn Realff, and a team of Georgia Tech students and Inman Middle School teachers received the Educational Partnership award from the Center for the Enhancement of Teaching and Learning for their development of and support for the Girls Excelling in Math and Science (GEMS) club at Inman Middle School.

References

1957 births
Living people
Georgia Tech faculty